Klaus Goldschlag,  (March 23, 1922 – January 30, 2012) was a Canadian ambassador.

Born in Berlin, Germany, he was a Jewish orphan living in Nazi Germany adopted by Alan Coatsworth, a Toronto fire-insurance broker.  After earning his master's degree in Arabic at the University of Toronto, he joined the diplomatic and foreign affairs department.

Public service

Goldschlag was ambassador to Turkey (1967–1971), Italy (1973–1976) and the Federal Republic of Germany. Goldschlag also served as Deputy Under-Secretary of State for External Affairs.  In 1981 he received the Outstanding Achievement Award for public service of Canada. In 1983, he was made an Officer of the Order of Canada.

References

External links
 Diplomat Klaus Goldschlag overcame tremendous obstacles Globe and Mail obituary by Sandra Martin, 14 May 2012

1922 births
2012 deaths
Officers of the Order of Canada
Jewish emigrants from Nazi Germany to Canada
Ambassadors of Canada to Turkey
Ambassadors of Canada to Italy
Ambassadors of Canada to West Germany